Stefano Incerti (born 25 July 1965) is an Italian film director. He has directed more than ten films since 1995.

In 2014, Stefano directed the drama Snowscape, about Donato (Roberto De Francesco), a man looking for something that would secure his future, and Norah (Esther Elisha), a woman who abandoned and chased by a small-time gangster, from whom she may have stolen something big.

Selected filmography

References

External links 

Stefano Incerti's Snowscape on Eurochannel

1965 births
Living people
Italian film directors
Film people from Naples